The United Covenant Churches of Christ or United Covenant Churches of Christ International is a Pentecostal Holiness denomination in the United States of America.

, the Presiding Bishop is Bishop GE Livingston. The organization has its office in Orlando,Florida.

The organization has developed from United Pentecostal Churches of Christ which was formed in 1992 by Bishop (later Archbishop) Jesse Delano Ellis and others, and had its office at Cleveland, Ohio.

History

May 1992 to June 2004: The United Pentecostal Churches of Christ
A Pentecostal congregation had been gathered at Cleveland, Ohio as long ago as 1935.  Bishop Ellis was called to the Pastorate of this church in May 1989.

The organization named United Pentecostal Churches of Christ came into being during 1992, as a result of a meeting convened by Bishop Ellis and held on May 29, 1992.

At the first plenary assembly (August 22, 1992), Bishop Ellis was recognized as general overseer and president.

Bishop Ellis led the organization for twelve years, until his resignation on June 8, 2004.

In 2004, the organization was active in the United States, India and Africa; it had 17 bishops and 300 congregations.

June 2004 to June 2009
Bishop Larry Darnell Trotter of Chicago was elected general overseer of the then "United Pentecostal Churches of Christ" on June 8, 2004, in succession to Bishop Ellis, and having been nominated for the role by Bishop Ellis.

Bishop Trotter was installed on December 11, 2004 and he led the organization until April 2009

It was during Bishop Trotter's time that the office of the organization moved from Cleveland, Ohio to Evergreen Park, Illinois (near Chicago).

A new name: United Covenant Churches of Christ
The name United Covenant Churches of Christ or United Covenant Churches of Christ International was adopted during Bishop Trotter's time as leader (2004-2009).

June 2009 Onwards
Bishop Eric Daniel Garnes of Brooklyn, New York was installed as general overseer and presiding prelate of United Covenant Churches of Christ on October 30, 2009.

The organization's founding figure, Bishop J. Delano Ellis served as Bishop Garnes' chief installer.

There was a congregation of about 2,500 present at Bishop Garnes' installation ceremony.

At the time of Bishop Garnes' installation, the United Covenant Churches of Christ had about 20,000 members.

In August/September 2020, Bishop Glenn E Livingston was chosen as the new ledaer in succession to Bishop Garnes.

Organizations with similar names
 International Pentecostal Church of Christ: offices at London, Ohio.
 Pentecostal Church of Christ merged in 1976 with International Pentecostal Association to form International Pentecostal Church of Christ. See above.
 Pentecostal Churches of Christ: offices at Cleveland, Ohio.  Led (2014) by Bishop J. Delano Ellis. 
 United Pentecostal Churches of Christ:  founded at Cleveland, Ohio in 1992 by Bishop J. Delano Ellis and others, and led by Bishop Ellis until 2004.  NOTE:  In a published pamphlet "A New Paradigm" the United Covenant Churches of Christ International (the organization that is the subject of this wikipage) claim themselves to be a renaming of United Pentecostal Churches of Christ.
 United Pentecostal Church International or United Pentecostal Church or UPCI:   this is part of the Oneness Pentecostal movement (see Oneness Pentecostalism). The organization is based in the St Louis suburb of Hazlewood, Missouri and claims two million adherents.

References

Categories

Charismatic and Pentecostal organizations
Christian organizations based in the United States
Holiness denominations